The Milano cookie (marketed as the Monaco in Canada) is a trademarked cookie manufactured by Pepperidge Farm as part of its series of "European" cookies. Each cookie consists of a thin layer of chocolate sandwiched between two biscuit cookies.

The Milano was created as a result of Pepperidge Farm's original cookie concept, the Naples, which was a single vanilla wafer cookie topped with dark chocolate.  

Many additional varieties are marketed, such as milk chocolate and double chocolate. Other flavors include a layer of mint, sweet orange paste, dulce de leche and lemon in addition to some form of chocolate.

Milano cookies have primarily been marketed as an indulgence food. Pepperidge Farm has taken legal action against alleged imitation cookies.

References

External links
Pepperidge Farm Website

Brand name cookies
Campbell Soup Company brands
Cookie sandwiches